Roy Roberts (born February 22, 1943) is an American blues musician, record producer, and singer-songwriter. Roberts grew up in a small town in Livingston, Tennessee, United States, listening to blues and R&B on radio stations. At the age of 14 he worked on a nearby farm to earn the money for his first guitar, a mail order Sears Silvertone.

History

Roberts left farm-life at age 18 to live with an uncle in Greensboro, North Carolina.  He was inspired to become a professional musician after he went to a nightclub where Jerry Butler was performing. Roberts worked hard honing his guitar skills while playing in bands until he landed a job with local Greensboro hero, Guitar Kimbers’ Untouchables. Before long, he began backing up major artists who came through town.

One major artist, Solomon Burke, took Roberts under his wing after letting him sit in as a bass player during a local gig. Roberts soon became the guitarist behind Burke on tour. Roberts subsequently picked up touring gigs with Eddie Floyd, “Little” Stevie Wonder, Dee Clark and Otis Redding, while fronting his own band, The Roy Roberts Experience, on the regional club scene and Southeastern beach town circuit.

Roberts began to cut records in the mid-1960s, staying mostly behind the scenes as a session musician with Eddie Floyd, Dee Clark, Stevie Wonder, William Bell, Solomon Burke, and Otis Redding. The death of Otis Redding inspired Roberts to step up to the microphone with a song dedicated to the late crooner. The record was released on Nina Simone’s NinaAndy label. Roberts followed this successful effort with a string of singles that carried him well into the 1970s. During the disco years, Roberts turned his talents to country music, touring with O.B. McClinton and releasing a number of country records. After a brief hiatus from the music scene, Roberts built a recording studio in Virginia in 1989, where he produced records by regional gospel artists and cut a gospel record of his own.

In the early 1990s, Roberts returned to Greensboro, and built Rock House Records recording studio. Besides recording his own material on Rock House, Roberts has produced albums for Priscilla Price, Lou Pride, Chick Willis, Skeeter Brandon, Floyd Miles and Eddie Floyd.  He has won numerous awards for his record production and his own music.

Discography
 Introducing Roy Roberts - 1994
 A Woman Needs Love - 1995
 Roy Roberts Live - 1995
 Every Shade of Blue - 1997
 Deeper Shade of Blue - 1999
 Burnin’ Love - 2001
 Daylight with a Flashlight - 2003
 Partners and Friends - 2004
 By Request -The Best of Roy Roberts - 2005
 Sicily Moon - 2006
 Roy Roberts & Friends (Blues & Soul Review) - 2006
 Man with a Message (Gospel) - 2007
 It's Only You - 2008
 Strange Love - 2011

Films
Scripture Cake, a movie written, directed, and produced by Dr. Emily D. Edwards, contained six songs by Roberts. Four were original material, two were instrumentals only. He also sings a medley of gospel songs.

Awards
 2001
Keeping the Blues Alive - Piedmont Blues Preservation Society
 2002
Cover of The Living Blues Magazine
The Living Blues Producer of the Year
Artist Most Deserving of Wider Recognition
Best Blues Album - Chick Willis' From the Heart & Soul was produced by Roy Roberts at his Rock House Records Studio
 2003
Franco Rubegni Award (For the spreading of soul music)
 2004
CBMA Blues Song of the Year for "I Slipped"
 2006
CBMA Pioneer Award and induction into the Hall of Fame
Interstate highway sign dedicated to Roberts by his hometown of Livingston, Tennessee

References

External links
 Carolina Beach Music Awards (Cammy)
 Roy Roberts Website
 Roy Roberts Recording Studio Website
 Scripture Cake movie poster
 

1943 births
Living people
African-American guitarists
American gospel singers
American blues singers
American blues guitarists
American male guitarists
Guitarists from Tennessee
Record producers from Tennessee
Singers from Tennessee
African-American country musicians
20th-century American guitarists
People from Livingston, Tennessee
Country musicians from Tennessee
20th-century American male musicians
20th-century African-American musicians
21st-century African-American people